The 2013 Tour of Austria was the 65th edition of the Tour of Austria, an annual bicycle race. Departing from Innsbruck on June 30, concluded in Vienna on July 7. The 1115.2 km long stage race is part of the 2013 UCI Europe Tour, and is rated as a 2.HC event.

Teams
18 teams were invited to participate in the tour: 9 UCI ProTeams, 4 UCI Professional Continental Teams and 5 UCI Continental Teams.

Stages

Stage 1
30 June 2013 – Innsbruck to Kühtai,

Stage 2
1 July 2013 – Innsbruck to Kitzbüheler Horn,

Stage 3
2 July 2013 – Heiligenblut to Matrei,

Stage 4
3 July 2013 – Matrei to Sankt Johann,

Stage 5
4 July 2013 – Sankt Johann to Sonntagberg,

Stage 6
5 July 2013 – Maria Taferl to Poysdorf,

Stage 7
6 July 2013 – Podersdorf am See to Podersdorf am See,

Stage 8
7 July 2013 – Podersdorf am See to Vienna,

Classification leadership

References
General
;Specific

External links

Tour of Austria
Tour of Austria
Tour of Austria